The Joint Committee on the Draft Parliamentary Buildings Bill is a joint select committee of the House of Commons and House of Lords in the Parliament of the United Kingdom. The committee was established in 2018 with a remit to consider the Draft Parliamentary Buildings Bill. They are due to report on 28 March 2019.

Membership 

As of 17 March 2019, the members of the committee are as follows:

See also 

 Joint Committee of the Parliament of the United Kingdom
 Parliamentary Committees of the United Kingdom

References

External links 

 Joint Committee on the Draft Parliamentary Buildings Bill UK Parliament

Joint Committees of the Parliament of the United Kingdom
Select Committees of the British House of Commons
1894 establishments in the United Kingdom